Anstis is a surname that may refer to:
John Anstis (1669–1744), English officer of arms and antiquarian
John Anstis, younger   (1708–1754), Officer of arms at the College of Arms in London
Marion Anstis, Australian herpetologist
Stuart Anstis, guitarist and songwriter, former member of Cradle of Filth
Thomas Anstis (died 1723), 18th-century pirate
Toby Anstis (born 1968), British radio presenter

See also
Anstice (disambiguation)
Anstiss